4 the People is a 2004 Indian Malayalam-language vigilante thriller film directed by Jayaraj and written by Iqbal Kuttippuram from a story by Jayaraj. It stars Arun Cherukavil, Bharath, Arjun Bose, and Padma Kumar in the title roles, along with Gopika and Narain in supporting roles. The film's soundtrack was composed by debutant Jassie Gift. The plot follows four engineering students who leads a double-life as members of a vigilante group called 4 the People who physically incapacitates corrupt public servants.  

The songs were trendsetters and pioneered a new style of composition in Malayalam cinema. 4 the People was a critical and commercial success at the box office, it was the highest-grossing Malayalam film of the year. The film was partially shot in Tamil as 4 Students. The film was remade in Telugu as Yuvasena (2004). It is followed by two sequels By the People (2005) and Of the People (2008).

Plot

Aravind (Arun), Vivek (Bharath), Eshwar (Arjun Bose) and Shafeek (Padma Kumar) are four engineering students from economically struggling families that were victims of society's corruption in one way or the other. Enraged by various injustices happening around them, the group take the law into their own hands and form the secretive clique called 4 The People that targets corrupt officials. They create an identity for themselves with their attire and mode of operation. They dress up in all black and ride bullet motorcycles. They even set up a website for the public to lodge their complaints.

From the complaints lodged they chose an official and cut their dominant arm to send a message to other officials and expose them in media with relevant evidences that they collect before attacking a target. The group gains a lot of public support and are regarded as heroes. Their actions also lead to government officials refusing to take bribes in fear of someone lodging a complaint against them to 4 The People. Soon, the police are on their track. A young cop Rajan Mathew (Narain) is in hot pursuit of the gang who are now targeting a corrupt minister.

The foursome attempt to kill the minister, but fail. Seeing the brutality of the police, the students come to the support of the foursome. One of the students kills the minister and is joined by three more students. It is concurrently revealed that these four students were benefited from 4 The People's influence in the society. They escape with the help of other students who were present there and forms another vigilane group- a gang of four.

Cast 
 Arun Cherukavil as Aravind Sebastian
 Bharath as Vivek
 Arjun Bose as Eeswar Iyer
 Padma Kumar as Shafeek	
 Gopika as Divya Anand 	
 Pranathi as Teena
 Narain as Rajan Mathew IPS (Credited as Sunil Kumar)
 Adhitya (Jai) as Rajath Kumar
 Chandra Banu as Suanathan A.C.P.
 Ani as Sidharthan G.I.
 Antony Mathew as Alexander Punnoose D.I.G.
 Unni Shivapal as MP's Son
 Babu Annur as Mahadevan MP
 Pradeep Kottayam

Soundtrack
Soundtrack was composed by Jassie Gift. All the songs in both Malayalam and Tamil versions became hugely popular. Jassie Gift later reused "Lajjavathiye" as "Mandakiniye" for Kannada film Hudugaata.

Malayalam

4 Students (Tamil version)

Release
The satellite rights of the film's Tamil version were sold to Star Vijay.

Sify wrote that "Jayaraj's 4 The People is a trendsetter and a welcome change in the placid superstar driven Malayalam film industry". Nowrunning said that "Though the storyline is wafer-thin, the narration is fast paced and the film is technically brilliant".

Box office
It became the highest-grossing Malayalam film of the year, grossing ₹3 crore against a budget of ₹40 lakh.

References

External links 
 

2000s Malayalam-language films
Indian vigilante films
People1
Indian action films
Malayalam films remade in other languages
2004 action films
2004 films
2000s vigilante films